Diego Andrés González Boneta (born November 29, 1990) is a Mexican actor, producer and singer. 
He gained wider recognition after starring in Rock of Ages (2012) and in the Netflix biographical series Luis Miguel: The Series (2018). He also starred in the romantic comedy films Father of the Bride (2022), and At Midnight (2023). 

He recorded his self-titled debut album with his first single, "Responde" in 2005.  A Brazilian version of the album with songs in Portuguese was recorded in 2006. In 2008, he released his second album titled Indigo.

Early life 
Boneta was born in Mexico City, the son of two engineers, Lauro González, born in Mexico City, and Astrid Boneta, born in the United States of Puerto Rican and Spanish origin. He has two siblings. Although he never knew his maternal grandfather, Otto Boneta, a songwriter and psychiatrist, Diego credits him with his musical talents. Boneta grew up in Los Angeles, California and Mexico City.

Boneta speaks Spanish and English fluently. Boneta has triple citizenship, the other two being from the United States and Spain.

Acting career
He started his career in Mexico singing and acting. He worked extensively in television and appeared in the reality show Código F.A.M.A.. He did two children's telenovelas: Alegrijes y rebujos and Misión S.O.S with Allison Lozz which were shown on Univision. He was also in the teenage-oriented telenovela Rebelde. In 2010, at the age of 20 years, he appeared in the TV series Pretty Little Liars as Alex Santiago and in 90210 as Javier Luna which was "practically me with a different name" where he could sing and compose, mainly "Siempre tú" which came out at the end of the second season and the beginning of the third. His first film came in 2011 as Tyler Adams in the teen flick Mean Girls 2 opposite Meaghan Martin and Jennifer Stone. Martin was the only actor he knew at that time, he recalled it was really easy to work with her because they were friends. The film also gave him the opportunity to experience high school for the first time, as he was tutored while working.

As he shot into the spotlight he became the cover model of TROIX magazine's 'March Men Madness' 2011 issue, introducing him as "Prince Charming".
His big Hollywood break came when he starred in Adam Shankman's film adaptation of the hit Broadway musical Rock of Ages alongside Tom Cruise and Julianne Hough. He played Drew Boley, a young upstart in Los Angeles in the late 1980s with dreams of becoming a rock star. Of Boneta's audition, Shankman called him the "next big thing" and compared him to Zac Efron, Channing Tatum, and Liam Hemsworth.

In 2012, Diego starred in the MTV series Underemployed. In this 12-episode series, Boneta played Miles González, a hilarious stripper. In 2014, Boneta was featured in Abercrombie & Fitch's "Making of a Star" campaign. As a result, photos of Boneta shot by Bruce Weber were featured in A&F stores worldwide. In 2015, Boneta played warrior Amram in the mini-series The Dovekeepers, and recorded the song "The Warrior" which was used as the series' opening theme. Between September and December 2015, he starred in Ryan Murphy's comedy-horror series Scream Queens for the Fox network.  The show featured an all-star cast including Ariana Grande, Keke Palmer, Nick Jonas, Emma Roberts, Jamie Lee Curtis and Lea Michele.

Boneta played Luis Miguel, the Grammy award-winning artist in the TV bio-musical series, Luis Miguel: The Series. The show is based on the early career of the famous Mexican artist. The series officially premiered on April 22, 2018 on Telemundo and Netflix, with its second season premiering in April 2021.

In 2022 he starred in the romantic comedy remake Father of the Bride (2022) portraying the romantic interest opposite Adria Arjona. The film also starred Andy Garcia and Gloria Estefan. The film was released on HBO Max and received positive reviews. The following year he starred in the Paramount+ romantic comedy At Midnight (2023) alongside Monica Barbaro. The film received mixed reviews for its story but also earned praise for the chemistry between the two leads. Boneta produced the film and received a story credit for writing the original draft of the film.

Music career

Diego
During his stint in Rebelde, he released his debut album, titled Diego, in Mexico, Chile and Brazil in 2005. The album was available for digital sale on April 3, 2006 and released in the United States on April 24. The first single, "Responde", became a top ten single in various countries including Argentina and Brazil. His songs were synchronized in the telenovela Rebelde and, once finished, he went on an international tour with Mexican pop group RBD as a guest. "It was a really cool experience, because in countries like Brazil or Romania everybody sang my songs in Spanish," he said.

When promoting his first album in Mexico he opened three concerts (in Mexico City, Guadalajara and Monterrey) for Hilary Duff in 2006.

Indigo
His second album, titled Indigo, was released on 25 March 2008. It features the single "Perdido en Ti" and "Losing Me", and is produced by Mitch Allan and written by Allan and Kara DioGuardi. On 5 May 2008, "Losing Me" and "Perdido En Ti" became iTunes Free Single of the Week.

Filmography

Film

Television

Discography

Studio albums

Video albums

Singles

Music videos

Soundtrack

Awards and nominations

References

External links
  
  
 

1990 births
Hispanic and Latino American male actors
Living people
Mexican male film actors
Mexican male child actors
Mexican child singers
Portuguese-language singers of Mexico
Mexican male telenovela actors
Mexican male television actors
Male actors from Mexico City
Singers from Mexico City
21st-century Mexican male actors
Mexican emigrants to the United States
21st-century Mexican singers
21st-century Mexican male singers
Mexican people of Puerto Rican descent
Mexican people of Spanish descent
Mexican expatriate actors in the United States